Janice S. Dodge is an American politician and former educator serving as a member of the Maine House of Representatives from the 97th district. She assumed office on December 5, 2018.

Early life and education 
Dodge was born and raised in Belfast, Maine. After graduating from Belfast Area High School, she earned a Bachelor of Music degree in music education from the University of Michigan in 1979.

Career 
For 31 years, Dodge worked as a music teacher in the Flanders Bay Community School District. She later worked for the Maine Education Association's Government Relations Committee. Dodge was elected to the Maine House of Representatives in November 2018 and assumed office on December 5, 2018. She is a member of the House Education and Cultural Affairs Committee.

References 

Living people
Democratic Party members of the Maine House of Representatives
People from Belfast, Maine
Women state legislators in Maine
University of Michigan alumni
People from Waldo County, Maine
Year of birth missing (living people)